Konobougou is commune in the Cercle of Barouéli in the Ségou Region of southern-central Mali. As of 1998 the commune had a population of 26,084.

References

Communes of Ségou Region